Parc is a Charleroi Metro station, located in downtown Charleroi, in fare zone 1. It is an underground station with a central platform accessible from the street at both ends.

Interior decoration, themed around the Lucky Luke Belgian comics character, features a fresco of the comics main characters on one side, and a short comics strip depicting a train attack by the Daltons on the other side. There's also a Lucky Luke statue outside of the station, near the park's eastern entrance.

Until 26 February 2012 Parc was the terminus of former lines 55 and 88. Trams would arrive from Janson on the western side of the central platform, then move forward to a turnback siding in a short tunnel section south of the station, before returning to the station for departure on the eastern side of the platform. The turnback now forms part of the Parc to Tirou section.

The station name (French for Park) comes from the adjacent municipal park.

Nearby points of interest 
 Queen Astrid municipal park.
 Charleroi courthouse.
 Schools : Collège du Sacré-Coeur and Athénée Royal Vauban.

Transfers 
TEC Charleroi bus lines 1, 3, 4, 8, 10, 15, 18, 25, 35, 37, 52, 71, 74, 86, 154, 158, 710, 722, E, City-Bus.

Photos 

Charleroi Metro stations
Railway stations opened in 1996